Caroline Coroneos "Carrie" Dormon (19 July 1888 – 21 November 1971) was a naturalist, ethnographer, and writer in Louisiana. She was a pioneer conservationist and was involved in the establishment of the Kisatchie National Forest and was also the first woman to work in environmental education in public schools as part of the Division of Forestry in Louisiana.

Biography 

Dormon was born at "Briarwood" near Saline, Louisiana to lawyer James Alexander and Caroline Trotti. The family also had a second home in Arcadia. Her mother was a writer and took an interest in gardening and Carrie too grew up with an interest in plants, and learned writing at the age of three. Along with her seven siblings she received a college education, she graduated from Judson College in 1907 with a degree in literature and art. She lost her mother around the same time and their family home in Arcadia along with a valuable library was lost in a fire. She then taught in public schools before moving in 1918 with her sister Virginia into a log-cabin at Briarwood. Concerned by the decline of old growth forests due to logging, she sought protection for some remaining patches. In 1921 she was invited to work in the forestry department, initially with public relations and later in extension and education from 1927 under W.R. Hine but she quit in 1928 when Huey Long became a governor. She attended meetings and wrote numerous letters to officials and in 1929 an old-growth forest tract was selected for protection and Dormon suggested the name for it as "Kitsachie", the name used for Kichai Indians and meaning "long cane".

Dormon also took an interest in archaeology and the ethnography of local Indians. She was respected by the local Indians and there was utilized by archaeologists from the Smithsonian who worked in the region. She received an honorary doctorate in 1965 from the Louisiana State University.

Writings 
She wrote several books including:

 Wild Flowers of Louisiana (1934)
 Forest Trees of Louisiana (1941)
 Flowers Native to the Deep South (1958)
 Natives Preferred (1965)
 Southern Indian Boy (1967)
 Bird Talk (1969)

References

External links 
 
 Sierra College - biography
 USDA - biography

1888 births
1971 deaths
American conservationists
American naturalists
American ethnographers
People from Bienville Parish, Louisiana
Writers from Louisiana
Judson University alumni
Louisiana State University alumni
American foresters